Virginia Wales Johnson (28 December 1849, in Brooklyn, New York – 16 January 1916) was a United States novelist.

Her parents were from Boston, and she was home schooled.  After 1875 she lived in Florence, Italy.

Works
Her early publications were mainly for young people. She later wrote fiction for adults.  Her works include:
 Kettle Club Series (1870)
 Travels of an American Owl (1870)
 Joseph the Jew (1873)
 A Sack of Gold (1874)
 The Catskill Fairies (1875)
 The Calderwood Secret (1875)
 A Foreign Marriage (1880)
 The Neptune Vase (1881) —  "her finest work" — 1920 Encyclopedia Americana
 The Famalls of Tipton (1885)
 Tulip's Place (1886)
 Miss Nancy's Pilgrimage (1887)
 The House of the Musician (1887)
 Lake Como: a World's Shrine, on Como, Italy (1902) at archive.org
 A Lift on the Road (1913)

Descriptive works
 The Lily of the Arno, or, Florence, Past and Present (1891)
 Genoa the Superb, the City of Columbus (1892)
 Many Years of a Florence Balcony (1911)

Notes

References

External links
 

1849 births
1916 deaths
19th-century American novelists
Writers from Florence
American expatriates in Italy
20th-century American novelists
American women novelists
20th-century American women writers
19th-century American women writers